The Deputy Assistant Secretary of the Navy for Air/Ground Programs (DASN (Air/Ground)) is a civilian office in the United States Department of the Navy.  The DASN (Air/Ground) reports to the Assistant Secretary of the Navy for Research, Development and Acquisition, and serves as the principal adviser to the Assistant Secretary on issues involving aircraft, sea-based cruise missiles, air-launched weapons and other airborne systems.

The DASN monitors and advises the assistant secretary on programs managed by the Naval Air Systems Command; tactical aircraft programs; air anti-submarine programs; Unmanned Aerial Vehicles; the Joint Strike Fighter and other programs.  The DASN makes programmatic and technical development recommendations; conducts independent studies; and analyzes industry capability for production and repair of aircraft.

The current DASN (Air/Ground) is William "Bill" E. Taylor.

References

External links
 DASN (Air/Ground) Website

Office of the Secretary of the Navy